The 2011 M&M Meat Shops Canadian Junior Curling Championships was held January 29-February 6 at The Glencoe Club and at the North Hill Community Curling Club in Calgary, Alberta.

Men's

Teams

Standings

Scores
Draw 1

Draw 2

Draw 3

Draw 4

Draw 5

Draw 6

Draw 7

Draw 8

Draw 9

Draw 10

Draw 11

Draw 12

Draw 13

Playoffs

Tiebreaker

Semi final

Final

Women's

Teams

Standings

Scores
Draw 1

Draw 2

Draw 3

Draw 4

Draw 5

Draw 6

Draw 7

Draw 8

Draw 9

Draw 10

Draw 11

Draw 12

Draw 13

Playoffs

Semifinal

Final

Qualification

Ontario
The Pepsi Ontario Junior Curling Championships were held January 5–9 at the Sarnia Golf & Curling Club in Sarnia.

Results:

Playoffs 
Men's semi final: Bryson 8-7 Krell
Men's final: Camm 7-5 Bryson

Women's tiebreaker: Van Huyse 6-4 Harrington
Women's semi final: Thurston 10-9 Van Huyse
Women's final: Grandy 6-5 Thurston

References

External links
Event statistics - Men
Event statistics - Women

Canadian Junior Curling Championships
Sport in Calgary
Curling in Alberta
Canadian Junior Curling Championships
Canadian Junior Curling Championships
Canadian Junior Curling Championships
Canadian Junior Curling Championships